Rajeev Paul (born 5 June 1970) is an Indian actor who has acted in Hindi television serials.

Career 
Paul is an actor on Indian television and has been known for the roles he has played in Swabhimaan, Kahani Ghar Ghar Kii and Nach Baliye. In 2012, Paul released a book of poetry called Hindi Mumbai Mohabbat Aur Tanhai.

He started his career as an actor on Mahesh Bhatt's television soap Swabhimaan. He has also worked with directors like Deepti Naval and Bharat Rangachary. He has also competed on the dance reality show Nach Baliye, in which he participated with his ex-wife, Delnaaz Irani.

As a contestant in Bigg Boss 6, he was evicted from the house just before the grand finale after completing 96 days in the house.

Television

Personal life
Paul met Delnaaz Irani, a television actress, on the set of Parivartan in 1993. After being married for 14 years, the couple separated in 2010 and were divorced in 2012.

References

External links
 
 An Interview with TV Actor Rajeev Paul (2004)

Indian male film actors
Living people
Indian male television actors
Participants in Indian reality television series
1970 births
Bigg Boss (Hindi TV series) contestants